BRA (Chinese: 内在美) is a 13 episode mini-series produced by Mediacorp Channel 5. The show was inspired by real-life cancer survivors and airs Mondays to Thursdays at 10pm.

Cast

Main Cast
Beatrice Chia as Alexis Chua, Head of Oncology at Republic Hospital
Belinda Lee as Brenda Low, beauty pageant winner, social worker and social media influencer
Dhaya Nambiar as Rathika Rajan, aspiring actress
Jimmy Taenaka as Adrian Tan, husband of Brenda
Jason Godfrey as Herman Yap, in love with Alexis, doctor at Republic Hospital
Koh Chieng Mun as Mdm Sophia, mother of Alexis, has Alzheimer's

Supporting Cast
Randall Tan as Chua Hock Heng, father of Alexis, former doctor at Republic hospital
Steve Yap as Chua Hock Hin, son of Hock Heng
James Kumar as Surya, longtime friend of Rathika
Tan Kheng Hua as Gloria Yap Edwards, mother of Herman
Beau Di Orazio as Brenda’s International Photographer

References 

Singaporean television series